Lolobo is a town in central Ivory Coast. Since 2009, it has been one of two sub-prefectures of Attiégouakro Department, Yamoussoukro Autonomous District.

Lolobo was a commune until March 2012, when it became one of 1126 communes nationwide that were abolished.

Villages in the sub-prefecture include Ouffouédiékro.

Notes

Sub-prefectures of Yamoussoukro
Former communes of Ivory Coast